Ajiyoshi Station is the name of two train stations in Japan:

 Ajiyoshi Station (Jōhoku Line)
 Ajiyoshi Station (Meitetsu)